This is a list of Loading TV affiliates, owned stations, and relays. Bolds are owned and operated stations, and italics are affiliates. The others stations are relay station. Also is possible watch Loading TV on the official website.

Brazil

Alagoas 
 Maceió - Channel 32  UHF Digital

Amazonas 
 Manaus - Channel 23 UHF Digital

Bahia 
 Salvador - Channel 13 VHF Digital

Espírito Santo 
 Vitória - Channel 28 UHF Digital

Federal District 
 Brasília - Channel 32 UHF Digital

Mato Grosso 
 Cuiabá - Channel 24 UHF Digital

Mato Grosso do Sul 
 Campo Grande - Channel 39 UHF Digital

Minas Gerais 
 Belo Horizonte - Channel 16 UHF Digital
 Conselheiro Lafaiete - Channel 44 UHF
 Contagem - Channel 16 and 29 UHF
 Formiga - Channel 2 VHF
 Juiz de Fora - Channel 18 UHF
 Mateus Leme - Channel 23 UHF
 Uberaba - Channel 54 UHF

Pará 
 Belém - Channel 25 UHF

Paraíba 
 João Pessoa - Channel 32 UHF Digital

Paraná 
 Cascavel - Channel 43 UHF
 Curitiba - Channel 29 UHF
 Londrina - Channel 44 UHF
 Maringá - Channel 25 UHF
 Foz do Iguaçu - Channel 15 UHF
 Tibagi - Channel 39 UHF

Pernambuco 
 Recife - Channel 7 VHF
 Jataúba - Channel 3 VHF

Rio de Janeiro 
 Angra dos Reis - Channel 51 UHF
 Rio de Janeiro - Channel 46 and 48 UHF

Rio Grande do Norte 
 Natal - Channel 25 UHF

Rio Grande do Sul 
 Caxias do Sul - Channel 25 UHF
 Porto Alegre - Channel 14 UHF
 Pelotas - Channel 24 UHF and 43 UHF (digital)
 Santa Maria - Channel 21 UHF

Rondônia 
 Vilhena - Channel 4 VHF

São Paulo 
 Araçatuba - Channel 57 UHF
 Araras - Channel 7 VHF
 Bauru - Channel 29 UHF
 Bebedouro - Channel 11 UHF
 Bariri - Channel 26 UHF
 Botucatu - Channel 46 UHF
 Franca - Channel 41 UHF
 Ilha Solteira - Channel 53 UHF
 Itápolis - Channel 10 VHF
 Itatiba - Channel 42 UHF
 Jaú - Channel 39 UHF
 Matão - Channel 56 UHF
 Patrocínio Paulista - Channel 5 VHF
 Paulínia - Channel 57 UHF
 Piracicaba - Channel 24 UHF
 Presidente Prudente - Channel 58 UHF
 Santos - Channel 56 UHF
 São José do Rio Preto - Channel 15 UHF
 São Manuel - Channel 21 UHF
 São Paulo - Channel 31 UHF digital
 Sorocaba - Channel 10 VHF
 Ribeirão Preto - Channel 55 UHF
 Rio Claro - Channel 57 UHF

References

External links 
 MTV Brasil affiliates
 ANATEL (SISCOM)

Grupo Abril
Ideal TV